Chitra is a corregimiento in Calobre District, Veraguas Province, Panama with a population of 1,301 as of 2010. Its population as of 1990 was 1,967; its population as of 2000 was 1,604.

References

Corregimientos of Veraguas Province